Mama Tried may refer to:

Mama Tried (album), a 1968 album by Merle Haggard
"Mama Tried" (song), title song from the album
"Mama Tried", a song by Quasi from their 2003 album Hot Shit!